The 2018–19 Utah State Aggies men's basketball team represented Utah State University in the 2018–19 NCAA Division I men's basketball season. The Aggies, led by first-year head coach Craig Smith, played their home games at the Smith Spectrum in Logan, Utah as members of the Mountain West Conference. The Aggies shared the regular-season Mountain West title with Nevada, and defeated New Mexico, Fresno State, and San Diego State to win the Mountain West tournament to earn the Mountain West's automatic bid to the NCAA tournament for their first appearance since 2011. They lost in the first round of the NCAA Tournament to Washington.

Previous season
The Aggies finished the 2017–18 season 17–17 overall and 8–10 in conference play, finishing tied for 7th. In the Mountain West Conference tournament, they defeated Colorado State in the first round and Boise State in the quarterfinals before losing to New Mexico in the semi-finals.

On March 11, 2018, head coach Tim Duryea was fired after three seasons. He finished at Utah State with a three-year record of 47–49. On March 25, reports indicated that the school had hired South Dakota head coach Craig Smith as head coach, which was confirmed the next day.

Offseason

Departures

Incoming transfers

Recruiting

Roster

Schedule and results

|-
!colspan=9 style=| Exhibition

|-
!colspan=9 style=| Non-conference regular season

|-
!colspan=9 style=| Mountain West regular season

|-
!colspan=9 style=| Mountain West tournament 

 
|-
!colspan=9 style=| NCAA tournament

References 

Utah State Aggies
Utah State Aggies men's basketball seasons
Aggies
Aggies
Utah State